Bocquillonia is a plant genus of the family Euphorbiaceae first described as a genus in 1862. The entire genus is endemic to New Caledonia (including smaller islands that are part of the territory). Molecular phylogenetic analyses suggest that Bocquillonia is nested in Alchornea.

Species

References

 
Euphorbiaceae genera
Flora of New Caledonia
Endemic flora of New Caledonia
Taxa named by Henri Ernest Baillon